The Black House (1981) is a collection of short stories by American author Patricia Highsmith.

Contents
 "Something the Cat Dragged In"
 "Not One of Us"
 "The Terror of Basket-Weaving"
 "Under a Dark Angel's Eye"
 "I Despise Your Life"
 "The Dream of the Emma C"
 "Old Folks at Home"
 "When in Rome"
 "Blow It"
 "The Kite"
 "The Black House"

Reception
"Her short stories represent a relatively minor part of her achievement; but within their limits they are almost always compelling, as they are here." – The New York Times 
"The Black House runs true to a beguilingly upsetting form." – Event
"Her stories are masterpieces of misanthropy and futility." – Irish Times

References

1981 short story collections
Crime short story collections
Short story collections by Patricia Highsmith
Heinemann (publisher) books